The FA-MAS Type 62 is a 7.62×51mm NATO rifle developed by the French Army as a replacement for the MAS-49/56. It was the last in series of 40 different prototype rifles designed between 1952 and 1962. However, the introduction of the 5.56×45mm cartridge caused the French to rethink their approach and the project was eventually cancelled. The Type 62's bayonet was later adopted for use on the FAMAS rifle.

Predecessors

Type-55
The MAS-55 has its gas piston underneath its barrel and operated in a similar way to the FM1924/29 light machine gun but resulted in a heavy rifle for its type.

Type-56
The Type-56 was a simpler alternative to the Type-55 and was closer to the FN FAL.

Type-59
The Type-59 came with an improved stock and foregrip. It also came with a folding stock, bipod and infra-red sight as the AP61.

See also
List of battle rifles

References

7.62×51mm NATO battle rifles
Rifles of France
Trial and research firearms of France